<div class="townBox">

Innere Stadt is the 1st district of the Austrian city of Graz, capital of the federal state of Styria. It is the part of the Old Town (in German: Altstadt) containing the Schloßberg and the city park (Stadtpark). The district borders are formed by the Mur river between Radetzkybrücke and Keplerbrücke, the Wickenburggasse, the Glacis, Jakominiplatz and the Radetzkystraße. The district covers an area of 1.16 km² and -as of 2011- has a population of 3,545.

In 1999, the Old Town was declared a UNESCO World Heritage Site.

History
For the most part, the history of the Innere Stadt is the history of Graz.

Points of interest
Antoniuskirche
Burg
Deutschritterordenshaus
Dom and Mausoleum
Dreifaltigkeitskirche
Franziskanerkirche
Glockenspielplatz
Hauptplatz
Herrengasse
Landhaus
Landeszeughaus
Murinsel
Opernhaus
Rathaus
Sackstraße
Schauspielhaus
Schloßberg 
Sporgasse
Stadtpark
Stadtpfarrkirche
Universalmuseum Joanneum

References

External links

 Website of the city of Graz  
 UNESCO World Heritage Centre entry

Graz
Districts of Graz
World Heritage Sites in Austria
Tourist attractions in Graz